The Jabłonowski Palace is a historic palace on Theatre Square in the Downtown (Śródmieście) district of Warsaw, Poland. Before World War II, the palace served as the Warsaw city hall.

History
The Jabłonowski Palace was built in 1773-85 for Antoni Barnaba Jabłonowski by Jakub Fontana and Dominik Merlini. In 1817-19 it was reconstructed to serve as the Warsaw city hall, replacing the dismantled old city hall. In 1863 the building was damaged by a fire set by demonstrating Polish patriots during the January 1863 Uprising. 

In 1864-69 the building was reconstructed in a Neo-Renaissance style. At that time, the characteristic tower was added.  

During the 1939 Invasion of Poland, the city hall served as headquarters of Warsaw's civil defense.  During the 1944 Warsaw Uprising, the German forces destroyed the building. In 1952-58 the city hall's debris was cleared.

In the 1990s the building was rebuilt to pre-1936 architectural plans.  The palace's overall shape, including tower and façade, is prewar. Some features were, however, built in contemporary style.

Notes

Palaces in Warsaw
City and town halls in Poland
Śródmieście, Warsaw